Mizrahi music (   , "Eastern music/Oriental music") refers to a music genre in Israel that combines elements from Europe, the Middle East and North Africa; and is mostly performed by Israelis of Mizrahi Jewish descent. It is usually sung in Modern Hebrew, or literary Hebrew.

Emergence of Mizrahi music

Background
Mizrahi Jews who immigrated from the Arab countries have, over the last 50 years, created a unique musical style that combines elements of Arabic, Turkish, and Greek music. This is not to be confused with the New Hebrew Style, as the Mizrahi style is more spontaneous.

After World War II, many Jewish families made Aliyah to the new state of Israel, founded in 1948. The Muzika Mizrahit movement started in the 1950s with homegrown performers in neighborhoods with a high concentration of Jews from Arab countries who would play at weddings and other events. They performed songs in Hebrew, but in an Arabic style, on traditional Arabic instruments—the oud, kanun, and the darbuka. In the 1960s, they added acoustic and electric guitar to their sound and so their sound became more eclectic. Vocalists usually decorated their singing with trills, and delivery was often nasal or guttural in sound. Intonation was typically Western, however; singers did not use the quartertone scales typical of Arabic music. Into the 1980s synthesizers and electronic instruments made their debut in Mizrahi music.

Lyrics were originally texts taken from classic Hebrew literature, including poems by medieval Hebrew poets. Later they added texts by Israeli poets, and began writing original lyrics as well. An example is the song "Hanale Hitbalbela" (Hannale was confused), sung by Yizhar Cohen. The lyrics are by the modern Israeli poet and lyricist Natan Alterman, to a traditional tune. Singers also translated childhood favorites from Arabic to Hebrew and added electronics and a faster tempo.

The 1970s and onward
Two of the first popular Mizrahi musicians were Zohar Argov and Avihu Medina. Argov grew up singing in his synagogue with a very defined Middle Eastern melisma. His definitive Mizrahi hit was Haperah BeGani (פרח בגני, lt. Flower in my Garden). After his suicide he became an icon in Israel for what happens when one is cheated by society and a political activist. A play ha-Melekh was written about his life story, portrayed his fall to drugs and his troubles with the law. It was extremely popular.

Avihu Medina was a singer and composer. He composed many popular hits for Argov. Women also began to play a significant part in popular Mizrahi music. A popular artist was Zehava Ben. Because of her ties to Morocco and the Middle East she began her career singing Umm Kulthum.

Because Mediterranean Israeli music was so popular within the Eastern Jewish communities, which were quickly becoming a large percentage of Israel, the natural outcome would be a continuous playback on the local radio station. However the national government restricted the play of Mizrahi music because it was not considered ‘authentic Israeli.’  The social researcher, Sami Shalom Chetrit, wrote "The educational and cultural establishment made every effort to separate the second generation of eastern immigrants from this music, by intense socialization in schools and in the media,".

The penetration of Muzika Mizrahit into the Israeli mainstream was the result of pressure by Mizrahi composers and producers such as Avihu Medina, the overwhelming, undeniable popularity of the style, and the gradual adoption of elements of Muzika Mizrahit by popular Israeli artists.  Yardena Arazi, one of Israel's most popular stars, made a recording in 1989 called "Dimion Mizrahi" (Eastern Imagination), and included original materials and some canonical Israeli songs.

The acceptance of Muzika Mizrahit, over the 1990s, parallels the social struggle of Israelis of Sephardic and Mizrahi origin to achieve social and cultural acceptance. "Today, the popular Muzika Mizrahit has begun to erase the differences from rock music, and we can see not a few artists turning into mainstream. This move to the mainstream culture includes cultural assimilation," writes literary researcher and critic Mati Shmuelof.

It is a widely accepted fact by now that the invention of the recordable cassette by the Philips Corporation and the commercial cassette distribution network in the Tel Aviv train station had a large impact on the popularity of Mediterranean Israeli music. Cassettes allowed the Mizrahi population create and distribute their own music within their communities. They also allowed for more musical integration. One could have Umm Kulthum and a neighbor who is an emerging singer.
Cassette tapes were a predominant factor in the growth of Mediterranean Israeli music in the 1970s. After first being a favorite at community celebrations, such as weddings and birthdays, the recording of one particular wedding party became a desired commodity in the Mizrahi ma'abarot ("transit camp"). These cassettes are what caused ethnomusicologist Amy Horowitz to start researching this blossoming new music style.

After Reuveni's friends and neighbors started offering to buy the cassettes he realized he might have a great opportunity on his hands. He and his brother later went on to become one of the major Mizrahi cassette companies in Israel.

Fusion genres
Over time fusions of Mizrahi music with other genres emerged, including oriental rock, hip hop, and pop.

Rock and metal
Rock Mizrahi ("oriental rock") is a wide term that incorporates several different Israeli musical styles. It is defined by the combining of rock music with middle eastern instruments, compositions and singing techniques. Comparison may be drawn with progressive rock, as Middle Eastern scales and rhythm tend to break western norms. Some examples are Orphaned Land, Knesiyat Hasekhel, Algeir and lead singer Aviv Guedj, Yosi Sassi and Dudu Tassa. Another notable examples is Fortisakharof, a creative duo consisting of Rami Fortis and Berry Sakharof. Both Fortis and Sakharof have partial Mizrachi backgrounds (Turkish and Iraqi). The oriental elements in their music range from very subtle to very apparent at times. The two began their project in 1989 following the break up of Post Punk group Minimal Compact. Both groups feature several Middle Eastern themes, including one song in Gibberish Arabic, "Sandanya", from their debut LP Foreign Affair.

The fusion of Mizrahi music and metal music can be defined as oriental metal. Other sub genres of Rock rarely categorize their oriental influences.

Pop
By the mid 1990s, Mizrahi Pop labels had already began to transform from underground operations distributing cassettes within the Mizrahi community to a much more formal and standardized Music Industry. Musicians and producers of that time were starting to incorporate more elements of Rock, Techno, Electronic dance music, Europop and R&B, while still strongly emphasizing the Greek, Turkish and Arab roots. Along with earlier examples like Ofra Haza and Ethnix, later acts like Zehava Ben, Eyal Golan, Sarit Hadad and others revolutionized the genre and brought it to much larger audiences. Some songs of this era had already become hits in neighboring countries, including Greece and Arab countries. Mizrahi Pop became a target to mockery and often disregarded by the mainstream pop culture of Israel at the time. Although demographically they may have been equally popular, most radio stations were refusing to play Mizrachi Pop, favoring American and European influenced pop and rock. The distinction between Mizrahi pop and the mainstream was clear. With many Mizrachi Pop hit singles still being low budget productions, mainstream critics and media were mostly ignoring the genre, with the excuse of Mizrachi Pop lacking artistic depth. Most songs were rather straight forward love songs, translations of Greek/Mediterranean songs or Jewish themed songs, with songwriting following a certain formula. This is why comparisons to other global "counterculture turned mainstream movements" are less appropriate, with Hip hop and reggae music being highly innovative, as well as political and protest oriented. It is, however, widely agreed that many Mizrahi pop songs do have a lot more in them than it first seems, so perhaps many of them were to some extent misunderstood for being ahead of their time.
There were also many cases of mutual influencing of the two movements in Israeli Pop as early as 1985, with some well known Ashkenazi songwriters admiring the Mizrahi sound. During the 2000s and 2010, Mizrahi Pop has grown to become the most prominent form of pop music in Israel. In 2019, singer Omer Adam sold 50,000 tickets in Hayarkon Park, only 1,000 people less to break Kaveret record of 51,000 people at the same place at 2013.

Well-known Mizrahi artists

Singers

 Zohar Argov (1955–1987) (Yemenite Jew)
 Ofer Levi
 Jo Amar (1930–2009) (Moroccan Jew)
 Avihu Medina (Yemenite Jew)
 Daklon (Yemenite Jew)
 Haim Moshe (Yemenite Jew)
 Tzion Golan (Yemenite Jew)
 Ofra Haza  (1957–2000) (Yemenite Jew)
 Shimi Tavori (Yemenite Jew)
 Eyal Golan (Yemenite Jew / Moroccan Jew)
 Sarit Hadad (Mountain Jew) 
 Moshik Afia (Lebanese Jew)
 Dudu Aharon  (Yemenite Jew) 
 Zehava Ben (Moroccan Jew)
 Amir Benayoun (Algerian Jew)
 Gad Elbaz (Moroccan Jew)
 Maya Buskila (Moroccan Jew)
 Itzik Kala (Kurdish Jew) 
 Yishai Levi (Yemenite Jew)
 Miri Mesika (Tunisian Jew / Iraqi Jew)
 Ninet Tayeb (Tunisian Jew / Moroccan Jew)
 Bo'az Ma'uda (Yemenite Jew)
 Lior Narkis (Serbian Jew (Greek-Tunisian ancestry) / Iraqi Jew)
 Avi Peretz (Moroccan Jew)
 Kobi Peretz (Moroccan Jew)
 Moshe Peretz  (Moroccan Jew / Iraqi Jew)
 Nasrin Kadri (Arab-Israeli ))
 Yehuda Saado
 Shlomi Shabat (Turkish Jew)
 Pe'er Tasi (Yemenite Jew)
 Margalit Tzan'ani (Yemenite Jew)
 Idan Yaniv (Bukharian Jew / Indian Jew)
 Kobi Oz (Tunisian Jew)
 Liora Itzhak (Indian Jew)
 Moti Taka (Ethiopian Jew)
 Moran Mazor (Georgian Jew)
 Omer Adam (Mountain Jew)
 Eden Ben Zaken (Moroccan Jew)
 Itay Levi

Music formations
 The Revivo Project - Raviv Ben Menachem, Nir Ben Menachem and Eliran Tsur

See also
 Coma Dance Festival
 Arabic music

References

Further reading
 ISRAEL’S HAPPINESS REVOLUTION: What my preschooler’s taste in Mizrahi pop says about where the country is at by Matti Friedman August 31, 2015, Tablet (magazine).

External links
Israeli Music Portal
A Taste of Jewish Music from the Sephardi World
mizrahi music
The Sephardic Pizmonim Project
 Haaretz
Linda, Linda by Haim Moshe
Elinor by Zohar Argoz

Israeli music
Mizrahi Jewish culture
World music genres
Jewish music genres